FKP Architects is an American architecture firm based in Houston, Texas. It specializes in the design of major academic, research, scientific, and healthcare projects. In 2017, FKP Architects merged with CannonDesign, a global architecture, engineering and planning firm.

Awards
 2010 Top 100 Green Design Firm
 2010 Best Higher Education/Research Project, Texas Construction Magazine: Rice University BioScience Research Collaborative
 2010 Award of Excellence, Higher Education/Research Project, Texas Construction Magazine: Texas A&M Health Science Center Health Professions Education Building
 2010 Best in Commercial Real Estate, San Antonio Business Journal: UT Health Science Center at San Antonio Medical Arts and Research Center
 2010 Landmark Award, Houston Business Journal: Texas Children's Hospital Feigin Center
 2009 Beacon Award for Critical Care Excellence, American Association of Critical-Care Nurses, Children’s Hospital of Orange County Pediatric Intensive Care Unit
 2008 Merit Award for Urban Planning, American Society of Landscape Architects, Texas A&M Health Science Center
 2008 Landmark Award, Houston Business Journal: Memorial Hermann Hospital Southwest - Heart & Vascular Institute

Current and recent projects

 Texas Children's Hospital Pavilion for Women, Houston, Texas
 Medical Arts & Research Center (MARC), UTHSCSA, Texas
 Biotechnology, Sciences and Engineering Building I, UTSA, San Antonio, Texas
 Nationwide Children's Hospital, Columbus, Ohio
 Le Bonheur Children's Hospital, Memphis, Tennessee
 CHOC Children's Hospital, Tower II, California
 Cook Children's Medical Center, North Tower, Dallas, Texas
 The Children's Hospital of Denver, Colorado
 Texas A&M Health Science Center, Bryan Campus Master Plan, Texas
 Rice University, BioScience Research Collaborative, Houston, Texas
 University of Texas Southwestern Medical Center Outpatient facility, Dallas, Texas
 The University of Texas MD Anderson Cancer Center, Master Plan, Texas

References

http://www.fkp.com/about_us/news/creating_a_rare_bond_texas_childrens_bridge

External links
 Official website

Companies based in Houston
Architecture firms based in Texas